Pirtle is a surname. Notable people with the surname include:

Brittany Anne Pirtle, actress
Cliff Pirtle (born 1985/86), American politician
Gerry Pirtle (born 1947), American baseball player
Michael W. Pirtle (born 1953), judge
Woody Pirtle, American artist